Betz's law indicates the maximum power that can be extracted from the wind, independent of the design of a wind turbine in open flow. It was published in 1919 by the German physicist Albert Betz. The law is derived from the principles of conservation of mass and momentum of the air stream flowing through an idealized "actuator disk" that extracts energy from the wind stream. According to Betz's law, no turbine can capture more than 16/27 (59.3%) of the kinetic energy in wind. The factor 16/27 (0.593) is known as Betz's coefficient. Practical utility-scale wind turbines achieve at peak 75–80% of the Betz limit.

The Betz limit is based on an open-disk actuator. If a diffuser is used to collect additional wind flow and direct it through the turbine, more energy can be extracted, but the limit still applies to the cross-section of the entire structure.

Concepts

Betz's law applies to all Newtonian fluids, including wind. If all of the energy coming from wind movement through a turbine were extracted as useful energy, the wind speed afterward would drop to zero. If the wind stopped moving at the exit of the turbine, then no more fresh wind could get in; it would be blocked. In order to keep the wind moving through the turbine, there has to be some wind movement, however small, on the other side with some wind speed greater than zero. Betz's law shows that as air flows through a certain area, and as wind speed slows from losing energy to extraction from a turbine, the airflow must distribute to a wider area. As a result, geometry limits any turbine efficiency to a maximum of 59.3%.

Independent discoveries 

British scientist Frederick W. Lanchester derived the same maximum in 1915. The leader of the Russian aerodynamic school, Nikolay Zhukowsky, also published the same result for an ideal wind turbine in 1920, the same year as Betz did. It is thus an example of Stigler's law, which posits that no scientific discovery is named after its actual discoverer.

Economic relevance 

The Betz limit places an upper bound on the annual energy that can be extracted at a site. Even if a hypothetical wind blew consistently for a full year, no more than the Betz limit of the energy contained in that year's wind could be extracted.

Essentially increasing system economic efficiency results from increased production per unit, measured per square meter of vane exposure. An increase in system efficiency is required to bring down the cost of electrical power production. Efficiency increases may be the result of engineering of the wind capture devices, such as the configuration and dynamics of wind turbines, that may increase the power generation from these systems within the Betz limit. System efficiency increases in power application, transmission or storage may also contribute to a lower cost of power per unit.

Proof 

The Betz Limit is the maximum possible energy that may be derived by means of an infinitely thin rotor from a fluid flowing at a certain speed.

In order to calculate the maximum theoretical efficiency of a thin rotor (of, for example, a windmill) one imagines it to be replaced by a disc that withdraws energy from the fluid passing through it. At a certain distance behind this disc the fluid that has passed through flows with a reduced velocity.

Assumptions

 The rotor does not possess a hub and is ideal, with an infinite number of blades, which have no drag. Any resulting drag would only lower this idealized value.
 The flow into and out of the rotor is axial. This is a control-volume analysis, and to construct a solution, the control volume must contain all flow going in and out, failure to account for that flow would violate the conservation equations.
 The flow is non-compressible. Density remains constant, and there is no heat transfer.
 Uniform thrust is exerted on the disc or rotor.

Application of conservation of mass (continuity equation) 

Applying conservation of mass to this control volume, the mass flow rate (the mass of fluid flowing per unit time) is given by

So the density times the area and speed should be equal in each of the three regions: before, while going through the turbine and afterward.

The force exerted on the wind by the rotor is the mass of air multiplied by its acceleration. In terms of the density, surface area and velocities, this can be written as

Power and work 

The work done by the force may be written incrementally as

and the power (rate of work done) of the wind is

Now substituting the force F computed above into the power equation will yield the power extracted from the wind:

However, power can be computed another way, by using the kinetic energy. Applying the conservation of energy equation to the control volume yields

Looking back at the continuity equation, a substitution for the mass flow rate yields

Both of these expressions for power are completely valid, one was derived by examining the incremental work done, and the other by the conservation of energy. Equating these two expressions yields

For all v and S the density cannot be 0. Examining the two equated expressions yields an interesting result, namely

or

Therefore, the wind velocity at the rotor may be taken as the average of the upstream and downstream velocities. This is arguably the most counter-intuitive stage of the derivation of Betz's law. This strong result is directly  a consequence of the "axial flow" assumption which disallows any massflow radial to axial flow in the actuator disk region.  Without mass escape and a constant diameter to the actuator region the air Speed cannot change in the interaction region and thus no energy can be extracted other than at the front and back of the interaction region, fixing the airspeed of the actuator disk to be the average. (Removing that restriction may allow higher performance than Betz law allows but other radial effects should also be considered. This constant velocity effect is distinct from the radial kinetic energy loss that is also ignored.)

Betz's law and coefficient of performance 

Returning to the previous expression for power based on kinetic energy:

The result is that  reaches maximum value when .

Substituting this value results in

The power obtainable from a cylinder of fluid with cross-sectional area  and velocity  is

The reference power for the Betz efficiency calculation is the power in a moving fluid in a cylinder with cross-sectional area  and velocity :

The power coefficient  (= ) is the dimensionless ratio of the extractable power  to the kinetic power  available in the undistributed stream.  It has a maximum value  (or 59.3%; however, coefficients of performance are usually expressed as a decimal, not a percentage).

In high wind speed, where the turbine is operating at its rated power, the turbine rotates (pitches) its blades to lower  to protect itself from damage. The power in the wind increases by a factor of 8 from 12.5 to 25 m/s, so  must fall accordingly, getting as low as 0.06 for winds of 25 m/s.

Understanding the Betz results 

The speed ratio  between outgoing and incoming wind implies that the outgoing air has only  the kinetic energy of the incoming air, and that  of the energy of the incoming air was extracted. This is a correct calculation, but it only considers the incoming air which eventually travels through the rotor.

The last step in calculating the Betz efficiency  is to divide the calculated power extracted from the flow by a reference power. As its reference power, the Betz analysis uses the power of air upstream moving at  through the cross-sectional area  of the rotor.

Because the cross-sectional area of wind flowing through the rotor changes, there must be some flow of air in the directions perpendicular to the axis of the rotor. Any kinetic energy associated with this radial flow has no effect on the calculation because the calculation considers only the initial and final states of the air in the system.

Points of interest 

The Betz limit has no dependence on the geometry of the wind extraction system, therefore  may take any form provided that the flow travels from the entrance to the control volume to the exit, and the control volume has uniform entry and exit velocities. Any extraneous effects can only decrease the performance of the system (usually a turbine) since this analysis was idealized to disregard friction. Any non-ideal effects would detract from the energy available in the incoming fluid, lowering the overall efficiency.

Some manufacturers and inventors have made claims of exceeding the limit by using nozzles and other wind diversion devices, usually by misrepresenting the Betz limit and calculating only the rotor area and not the total input of air contributing to the wind energy extracted from the system.

The Betz limit has no relevance when calculating turbine efficiency in a mobile application such as a wind-powered vehicle, as here the efficiency could theoretically approach 100% minus blade losses if the fluid flow through the turbine disc (or equivalent) were only retarded imperceptibly. As this would require an infinitely large structure, practical devices rarely achieve 90% or over. The amount of power extracted from the fluid flow at high turbine efficiencies is less than the Betz limit, which is not the same type of efficiency.

Modern development 

In 1934 H. Glauert derived the expression for turbine efficiency, when the angular component of velocity is taken into account, by applying an energy balance across the rotor plane. Due to the Glauert model, efficiency is below the Betz limit, and asymptotically approaches this limit when the tip speed ratio goes to infinity.

In 2001, Gorban, Gorlov and Silantyev introduced an exactly solvable model (GGS), that considers non-uniform pressure distribution and curvilinear flow across the turbine plane (issues not included in the Betz approach). They utilized and modified the Kirchhoff model, which describes the turbulent wake behind the actuator as the "degenerated" flow and uses the Euler equation outside the degenerate area.

In 2008, viscous computations based on computational fluid dynamics (CFD) were applied to wind turbine modeling and demonstrated satisfactory agreement with experiment. Computed optimal efficiency is, typically, between the Betz limit and the GGS solution.

References 

 Ahmed, N. A. & Miyatake, M. A Stand-Alone Hybrid Generation System Combining Solar Photovoltaic and Wind Turbine with Simple Maximum Power Point Tracking Control, IEEE Power Electronics and Motion Control Conference, 2006. IPEMC '06. CES/IEEE 5th International, Volume 1, Aug. 2006 pages 1–7.
 Betz, A. The Maximum of the theoretically possible exploitation of wind by means of a wind motor, Wind Engineering, 37, 4, 441–446, 2013, Translation of: .

External links 

 The Betz limit - and the maximum efficiency for horizontal axis wind turbines
 Pierre Lecanu, Joel Breard, Dominique Mouazé. Betz limit applied to vertical axis wind turbine theory

Wind power
1919 in science
1919 in Germany